Lulingu is a town in the South Kivu province of the Democratic Republic of Congo,  west of Bukavu. It has a population of under 30,000. Sidney Coles described the town in 2018 as "isolated, set into misty hills that are blanketed by dense jungle".

References

Populated places in South Kivu